The National Language Act 1963/67, is a Malaysian laws which enacted to consolidate the law relating to the use of the national language.

Structure
The National Language Act 1963/67, in its current form (1 January 2006), consists of 11 sections and no schedule (including 4 amendments), without separate Part.
 Section 1: Short title, application and commencement
 Section 2: National language to be used for official purposes
 Section 3: Use of translation
 Section 4: Continued use of English may be permitted
 Section 5: Use of English language may be permitted in Parliament and Legislative Assembly
 Section 6: Authoritative text of laws
 Section 7: Written laws enacted prior to 1 September 1967
 Section 8: Language of Courts
 Section 9: Script of national language
 Section 10: Form of numerals
 Section 11: Forms

References

External links
 National Language Act 1963/67 
 Script of the National Language: Motion by Onn Jaafar, MP for Kuala Trengganu Tengah on 14 December 1959 in the Dewan Rakyat

1963 in Malaysian law
1967 in Malaysian law
Malaysian federal legislation